Madame Guillotine is a 1931 British historical romance film directed by Reginald Fogwell and starring Madeleine Carroll, Brian Aherne and Henry Hewitt. It was shot at Isleworth Studios.

Plot summary 
During the French Revolution, a revolutionary falls in love with and marries a noblewoman.

Cast 
 Madeleine Carroll as  Lucille de Choisigne
 Brian Aherne as  Louis Dubois
 Henry Hewitt as Vicomte d'Avennes
 Frederick Culley as Marquis
 Hector Abbas as Le Blanc
 Ian MacDonald as Jacques
 J. Fisher White as Le Farge

References

Bibliography
 Low, Rachael. Filmmaking in 1930s Britain. George Allen & Unwin, 1985.
 Wood, Linda. British Films, 1927-1939. British Film Institute, 1986.

External links 

1930s historical romance films
1931 films
British black-and-white films
British historical romance films
Films directed by Reginald Fogwell
French Revolution films
1930s English-language films
1930s British films